The Schiller Prize of the City of Mannheim has been awarded by the City of Mannheim since 1954. It was donated on the occasion of the 175th anniversary of the National Theatre. The prize is awarded every two years and endowed with €20,000. It is awarded for "outstanding contribution to cultural development". Supported by a jury, the municipal council decides the winner. From 27 July 1783 to 9 April 1785, Friedrich Schiller lived and worked as a theater poet in Mannheim. Schiller's The Robbers was premiered 1782 in Mannheim.

Recipients
Source:

 1954 Mary Wigman
 1956 Jürgen Fehling
 1958 Friedrich Dürrenmatt
 1960 Theodor Eschenburg
 1962 Elisabeth Bergner
 1964 Golo Mann
 1966 Carl Wurster
 1968 Hartmut von Hentig
 1970 Ida Ehre
 1972 Peter Handke
 1974 Horst Janssen
 1978 Peter Stein
 1982 Leonie Ossowski
 1986 Dieter Hildebrandt
 1990 Lea Rosh
 1994 Alfred Grosser
 1998 Wolfgang Menge
 2002 Frank Castorf
 2005 Rhythm Is It!
 2006 Nico Hofmann
 2010 Jan Philipp Reemtsma
 2012 Silvia Bovenschen
 2014 Georg Stefan Troller
 2016 Klaus Theweleit
 2018 Uwe Timm
 2020 Christian Petzold
 2022 Emine Sevgi Özdamar

References

External links
 

Awards established in 1954
German awards
1954 establishments in Germany
Friedrich Schiller
Culture in Mannheim